The Celebration of Life Monument is a visual art display in Salt Lake City, Utah, United States. The monument commemorates organ donors, and is located southeast of the Salt Lake City Public Library.

History
The memorial was vandalized in May 2020 during a civil unrest incident in the area.

References

External links

Monuments and memorials in Utah
Organ donation
Outdoor sculptures in Salt Lake City
Vandalized works of art in Utah